Weatherston is a surname. Notable people with the surname include:

David Weatherston (born 1986), Scottish footballer
Katie Weatherston (born 1983), Canadian ice hockey player and coach
Tom Weatherston (born 1950), American industrial engineer and politician

See also
Weatherson